The 2004–05 Slovenian PrvaLiga season started on 1 August 2004 and ended on 29 May 2005. Each team played a total of 32 matches.

First stage

Table

Results

Second stage

Championship group

Table

Results

Relegation group

Table

Results

Top goalscorers 

Source: PrvaLiga.si

See also
2004–05 Slovenian Football Cup
2004–05 Slovenian Second League

References
General

Specific

External links
Official website of the PrvaLiga 

Slovenian PrvaLiga seasons
Slovenia
1